Cherubusco Newton (May 15, 1848 – May 26, 1910) was an American lawyer and politician who served as a U.S. representative from Louisiana from 1887 to 1889.

Early life and career
Born in Greensburg, St. Helena Parish, Louisiana, Newton attended private schools in Bastrop, Louisiana, and the Louisiana State University, then at Alexandria, Louisiana. He taught school while he studied law. He was admitted to the bar in 1870 and commenced practice in Bastrop.

He served as a member of the Louisiana State Senate from 1879 to 1883. He declined a judgeship in 1885.

Congress
Newton was elected as a Democrat to the Fiftieth Congress (March 4, 1887 – March 3, 1889). He was an unsuccessful candidate for renomination in 1888. He served as delegate to the Democratic National Convention in 1888.

After Congress
He resumed the practice of law in Bastrop, for several years, and then moved to Monroe, Ouachita Parish, Louisiana, where he continued the practice of law until his death on May 26, 1910. He was interred in the New Cemetery, Bastrop.

References

1848 births
1910 deaths
Democratic Party members of the United States House of Representatives from Louisiana
Democratic Party Louisiana state senators
19th-century American politicians
People from Greensburg, Louisiana